The 2015 Japanese Formula 3 Championship was the 37th edition of the Japanese Formula 3 Championship.

Teams and drivers
All teams were Japanese-registered.

Race calendar and results
A provisional calendar for the 2015 season. All races are scheduled to be held in Japan.

Championship standings

Drivers' Championships
Points are awarded as follows:

Overall

National Class

Teams' Championship
Points are awarded as follows:

Engine Tuners' Championship

References

External links
  

Japanese Formula 3 Championship seasons
Formula Three
Japan Formula Three
Japanese Formula 3